DJKA Station is a station of the Palembang LRT Line 1. located in the town of Rambutan, Banyuasin Regency.

The station is close to the Ogan Permata Indah Mall. The station became one of six stations that opened at the Palembang LRT launch on 1 August 2018.

The station is probably named after Directorate General of Railways (abbreviated as DJKA) of Ministry of Transportation, one of the co-owners of the system's track.

Station layout

References

Railway stations in South Sumatra
Railway stations opened in 2018